"Lost Cat" is a song recorded by the Welsh band Catatonia, taken from their first studio album, Way Beyond Blue. It was written by Cerys Matthews and Mark Roberts, and produced by Stephen Street.

Recording and release
Elfyn Lewis created the cover artwork for the single, which was released on 22 April 1996. This coincided with the middle of a UK tour the band were on at the time, intended to maximise press exposure. During the production of the video, the London Fire Brigade were called out by a passer-by, who reported that a woman was stuck up a lamppost. It was singer Cerys Matthews.

The single reached 41st position in the UK charts, just missing out becoming the band's first top 40 hit. The band were pleased with the position, which had been their highest charting release to date.

Charts

Notes

References

 

1996 singles
Catatonia (band) songs
1996 songs
Blanco y Negro Records singles
Songs written by Cerys Matthews
Songs written by Mark Roberts (singer)
Song recordings produced by Stephen Street